
This is a list of places in Faroe Islands having standing links to local communities in other countries. In most cases, the association, especially when formalised by local government, is known as "town twinning" (though other terms, such as "partner towns" or "sister cities" are sometimes used instead), and while most of the places included are towns, the list also comprises villages, cities, districts, counties, etc. with similar links.

E
Eiði

 Arsuk, Greenland
 Countryside, Åland Islands, Finland
 Herning, Denmark
 Holmestrand, Norway
 Husby, Germany
 Kangasala, Finland
 Siglufjörður, Iceland
 Vänersborg, Sweden

F
Fuglafjørður

 Aalborg, Denmark
 Ilulissat, Greenland
 Norðurþing, Iceland

K
Klaksvík

 Kópavogur, Iceland
 Norrköping, Sweden
 Odense, Denmark
 Qeqqata, Greenland
 Saint Petersburg, Russia
 Taiji, Japan
 Tampere, Finland
 Trondheim, Norway
 Wick, Scotland, United Kingdom

R
Runavík

 Fljótsdalshérað, Iceland
 Hjørring, Denmark
 Ísafjarðarbær, Iceland
 Uummannaq, Greenland

S
Sørvágur
 Akranes, Iceland

T
Tórshavn

 Esbjerg, Denmark
 Frederiksberg, Denmark
 Mariehamn, Åland Islands, Finland
 Nuuk, Greenland
 Reykjavík, Iceland

Tvøroyri
 Hafnarfjörður, Iceland

V
Vágar
 Fjarðabyggð, Iceland

Vágur
 Akureyri, Iceland

Vestmanna
 Snæfellsbær, Iceland

References

Faroe Islands
Twin towns